Frank Joseph Donahue (August 2, 1881 – August 24, 1979) was an American politician who served as the Massachusetts Secretary of the Commonwealth, Chairman of the Massachusetts Democratic State Committee, and as an associate justice of the Massachusetts Superior Court.

1912 Election
Before the 1912 election the Progressive Bull Moose party split from Republican party.  The Republican vote was split between the Republicans and Progressives.  Donahue defeated Republican Albert P. Langtry by a plurality of 4,576 votes.

Reelection in 1913
In the 1913 election Progressives and Republicans again candidates for Secretary of the Commonwealth.  The Republican vote was again split.  Donahue was reelected by a 42,642 plurality.

Associate Justice of the Massachusetts Superior Court
Donahue was appointed as an associate justice of the Massachusetts Superior Court, he served as an associate justice of the Court  for forty-two years.  Frank J. Donahue was succeeded as a Superior Court Justice by his son Roger J. Donahue.

References

External links
Biography of Donahue from Suffolk University Law School

Secretaries of the Commonwealth of Massachusetts
Massachusetts Democrats
Suffolk University Law School alumni
1979 deaths
1881 births
20th-century American politicians
20th-century American judges